The Austria national alpine ski team, also known as Wunderteam, represents Austria in International alpine skiing competitions such as Winter Olympic Games, FIS Alpine Ski World Cup and FIS Alpine World Ski Championships.

World Cup
Austrian alpine skiers won 34 overall FIS Alpine Ski World Cup, 17 with men and 17 with women and won 926 races.

Update to the end of 2021-22 season

Titles

Men

Women

Wins

Men

Women

See also
Austria at the Olympics

References

External links
 

Alpine ski
Austria
Alpine skiing organizations